The canton of Beaune-la-Rolande is a former canton of the département of Loiret, in France. Since 1800 it has been a part of the Arrondissement of Pithiviers. Between 1926 and 1942 it was part of the Arrondissement of Montargis. It was disbanded following the French canton reorganisation which came into effect in March 2015. It consisted of 18 communes, which joined the canton of Le Malesherbois in 2015.

The canton of Beaune-la-Rolande contained the following 18 communes and had 10,517 inhabitants (2012).

Auxy
Barville-en-Gâtinais 
Batilly-en-Gâtinais 
Beaune-la-Rolande
Boiscommun 
Bordeaux-en-Gâtinais 
Chambon-la-Forêt
Courcelles
Égry
Gaubertin
Juranville
Lorcy
Montbarrois
Montliard
Nancray-sur-Rimarde
Nibelle
Saint-Loup-des-Vignes
Saint-Michel

Councillors
November 13, 1833 – November 24, 1839: Charles Louis Marcille - then mayor of Beaune-la-Rolande
November 24, 1839 – August 6, 1841: Charles Nicolas Hippolyte Bourgeois 
August 6, 1841 – April 10, 1844: Charles Louis Marcille, then mayor of Beaune-la-Rolande
April 10, 1844 – April 15, 1855: François Paul Favereau
April 15, 1855 – August 8, 1858: Alexandre Theodore Favereau, then mayor of Nancray-sur-Rimarde
August 8, 1858 – April 1, 1888: Louis Theodore Anceau, then mayor of Gaubertin 
April 1, 1888 – July 28, 1907: Christophe Charles Camille Gravost, then mayor of Beaune-the-Rolande  
July 28, 1907 – October 18, 1931: Georges Thomas, then mayor of Auxy
October 18, 1931-?: Paul Cabanis: served as Deputy of Loiret from 1935 and the mayor of Beaune-la-Rolande 

1982-: Michel Grillon

References

Beaune-la-Rolande
2015 disestablishments in France
States and territories disestablished in 2015